The 1983 International cricket season was from May 1983 to August 1983.

Season overview

June

Prudential World Cup 1983

July

New Zealand in England

References

1983 in cricket